Higino is a surname. Notable people with the surname include:

Carlos Higino (born 1972), Brazilian economist and politician
Diego Higino (born 1986), Brazilian football player

See also
Higinio
Higino (given name)